Pyŏktong County is a kun, or county, in northern North P'yŏngan province, North Korea.  It lies in the valley of the Yalu River, and borders China to the north. Within North Korea, it is bounded by Tongch'ang in the south, Ch'angsŏng in the west, and Usi county in Chagang province to the east. It was separated from Usi in 1952, as part of a nationwide reorganization of local government.

Geography
The terrain is steep and mountainous, with the Kangnam and Pinandŏk ranges both passing through the county. The highest point is Piraebong, at 1470 metres. There are various small streams, including the Tongch'ŏn (동천), Songgyech'ŏn (송계천), and Namch'ŏn (남천).  These are used to transport cut lumber; and the Namch'ŏn is also used to generate hydroelectric power. Due to the rugged terrain, only seven percent of Pyoktong's area is cultivated, while 80% is forested.

Administrative divisions
Pyŏktong county is divided into 1 ŭp (town) and 19 ri (villages):

Climate
The average year-round temperature is 7.1 °C, plunging to a mean of -12.5 °C in January and rising to 23 °C in August.  The climate is relatively dry, with an average annual rainfall of 992 mm.

Economy
Forestry is the chief local industry. The farms produce maize, soybeans, sweet potatoes, potatoes, gochu peppers, and hops.  Livestock are also raised; Pyŏktong ranks second nationwide in sheep production.

See also
 Geography of North Korea
 Administrative divisions of North Korea

References

External links
 

Counties of North Pyongan